The 1949–50 FA Cup was the 69th season of the world's oldest football cup competition, the Football Association Challenge Cup, commonly known as the FA Cup. Arsenal won the competition for the third time, beating Liverpool 2–0 in the final at Wembley, through two goals from Reg Lewis.

Matches were scheduled to be played at the stadium of the team named first on the date specified for each round, which was always a Saturday. Some matches, however, might be rescheduled for other days if there were clashes with games for other competitions or the weather was inclement. If scores were level after 90 minutes had been played, a replay would take place at the stadium of the second-named team later the same week. If the replayed match was drawn further replays would be held until a winner was determined. If scores were level after 90 minutes had been played in a replay, a 30-minute period of extra time would be played.

Calendar

First round proper

At this stage clubs from the Football League Third Division North and South joined the 25 non-league clubs having come through the qualifying rounds. Rotherham United, Reading and A.F.C. Bournemouth, as the strongest Third Division finishers in the previous season, were given a bye to the Third Round. To make the number of matches up, non-league Yeovil Town and Bromley were given byes to this round. 34 matches were scheduled to be played on Saturday, 26 November 1949. Three were drawn and went to replays.

Second round proper
The matches were played on Saturday, 10 December 1949. Six matches were drawn, with replays taking place later the same week. One of these replays went to a second replay.

Third round proper
The 44 First and Second Division clubs entered the competition at this stage, along with the three strongest finishers from the previous season's Third Division, Rotherham United, Reading and A.F.C. Bournemouth. The matches were scheduled for Saturday, 7 January 1950. Nine matches were drawn and went to replays, with one of these going to a second replay.

Fourth round proper
The matches were scheduled for Saturday, 28 January 1950. Six games were drawn and went to replays, which were all played in the following midweek match.

Fifth Round Proper
The matches were scheduled for Saturday, 11 February 1950. There were three replays in total, each taking place four days later.

Sixth Round Proper
The four quarter-final ties were scheduled to be played on Saturday, 4 March 1950. There were no replays.

Semi-finals
The semi-final matches were intended to be played on Saturday, 18 March 1950, although the Liverpool–Everton fixture was not played until the week after. The London derby clash of Arsenal–Chelsea went to a replay, with Arsenal eventually winning their tie to meet Liverpool in the final at Wembley.

Replay

Final

The 1950 FA Cup Final was contested by Arsenal and Liverpool at Wembley. Arsenal won 2–0, with both goals scored by Reg Lewis. Future legendary Liverpool manager Bob Paisley was famously dropped for the final, even after scoring the winning goal against rivals Everton in the semi final.

Match facts

See also
FA Cup Final Results 1872-

References
General
Official site; fixtures and results service at TheFA.com
1949-50 FA Cup at rssf.com
1949-50 FA Cup at soccerbase.com

Specific

 
FA Cup seasons